KSKO-FM is a non-commercial radio station in McGrath, Alaska, broadcasting on 89.5 FM. KSKO is rebroadcast on Class D FM repeaters full time in Grayling, Shageluk, Holy Cross, Nikolai, and Anvik. For part of the day, KSKO is also rebroadcast on KZPA 900 in Fort Yukon and KRFF 89.1 in Fairbanks; KSKO also rebroadcasts a midday show from KRFF. Two new "repeaters" were built in the summer and fall of 2021, KSKC Crooked Creek and KSKP Sleetmute which added 200 people to KSKO's "population served" count for a total of about 1,200 on owned and operated repeaters/signals across a stretch of 200 miles or so along the west central interior.

The station began broadcasting on July 1, 1981, initially on a frequency of 870 kHz on the AM dial. Station owners Kuskokwin Public Broadcasting Corporation switched from AM to FM in 2015. This switch was made after the AM, which was generator powered 24/7 south of the village, became too costly to operate at over $6 a gallon of generator fuel. KSKO-FM 89.5 is on city commercial power at the studio and the repeaters are located at schools, which are on their villages’ commercial power.

KSKO celebrated its 40th anniversary on July 1, 2021.

KSKO holds the annual "Back to Bluegrass" music festival in McGrath, which is held in the in June or July featuring local and regional musicians. The event is a fundraiser for KSKO.

Repeaters

References

External links

 Facebook page for the Back to Bluegrass festival

SKO
NPR member stations
Radio stations established in 1975
1975 establishments in Alaska
Radio stations disestablished in 2015
2015 disestablishments in Alaska